Kimberly Tara "Kim" Dexter (née, Sipus; born November 7, 1968) is an American Christian musician, who plays worship and Christian pop music. She has released two studio albums, So This Is It (2006) and Reaching (2014).

Early and personal life
Dexter was born Kimberly Tara Sipus, on November 7, 1968, in Augusta, Georgia, to Ronald and Carol Sipus (née, Malone), while she was raised in Phoenix, Arizona. She graduated from Scottsdale Christian Academy, then going to Grand Canyon University, majoring in music. She married Paul Dexter, her former band member with Mayfair Laundry and a bassist in the mid-2000s. They have two children, Maggie and Hudson. Dexter resides in Los Angeles, California.

Music history
Her music recording career began in 1997, with the band Mayfair Laundry, before starting her solo music career in 2006. She released So This Is It in 2006 with 7k Records. The subsequent studio album, Reaching, was released on June 10, 2014, independently.

Discography
Albums
 So This Is it (2006, 7k)
 Reaching (June 10, 2014)

References

External links
 
 Hallels Interview

1968 births
American performers of Christian music
American women singers
Living people
Musicians from Augusta, Georgia
Musicians from Phoenix, Arizona
Musicians from Los Angeles
Songwriters from Georgia (U.S. state)
Songwriters from Arizona
Songwriters from California
Singers from Arizona
21st-century American women